HMIS Gondwana was a World War II  of the Royal Indian Navy (RIN). She was originally ordered for and commissioned as HMS Burnet of the Royal Navy, but transferred to RIN immediately upon commissioning.

She was transferred back to the Royal Navy in 1946 and subsequently sold to the Royal Thai Navy in 1947, and commissioned as HTMS Bangpakong.

History
Burnet was ordered from Ferguson Shipbuilders, Limited in Glasgow for the Royal Navy in 1942. She was transferred to the Royal Indian Navy immediately and commissioned as HMIS Gondwana on 15 May 1945, just months before the end of World War II. After the war, she was briefly used as an apprentice seaman training ship before being transferred back to the Royal Navy just on 17 May 1946.

She was sold to the Royal Thai Navy in 1947 as HTMS Bangpakong, and served in the Korean War in 1950–1951 before returning to Thailand. Bangpakong has since been decommissioned.

References 

 

Flower-class corvettes of the Royal Indian Navy
1943 ships
Ships built on the River Clyde